Don't Take It Personal may refer to:

 "Don't Take It Personal (Just One of Dem Days)", a 1995 song by American R&B singer Monica
 Don't Take It Personal (album), a 1989 album by singer Jermaine Jackson
 "Don't Take It Personal" (Jermaine Jackson song), 1989